Foiled is the fourth studio album by American rock band Blue October, released on April 4, 2006, by Universal Records. The album debuted at number 29 on the US Billboard 200, marking the band's first entry on the chart. The album was certified gold in the United States on August 9, 2006, and on February 22, 2007, was certified platinum. The album was also a success in Canada, where it has also achieved platinum status. It was supported by four singles: "Hate Me", "Into the Ocean", "She's My Ride Home", and "X Amount of Words".

Background 
The album was recorded during the summer of 2005. Most of the songs on the album are older Blue October and 5591 songs, except for "Into the Ocean" and "Hate Me", which were written in early 2005 while Justin Furstenfeld was living in Los Angeles and recording the early demos for the album. Foiled was originally going to be titled Beyond the Sadness and was to be released October 11, 2005. During the fall of 2005, the working title was changed to Living Just to Watch It All Go By, which is a lyric from the song "It's Just Me". The eventual album title Foiled was coined by Justin Furstenfeld and Jeremy Furstenfeld's father, Dan Furstenfeld, as a tongue-in-cheek reference to the album's numerous delays. Two promotional spin-offs, Foiled Again and Foiled for the Last Time, were released in 2007. Foiled was listed at number 150 among Billboards top 200 albums of 2007.

Singles 
"Hate Me" was the first single from the album. A video for the song appeared on VH1, and the song peaked at number two on the Modern Rock charts.

The second single, "Into the Ocean", was also successful on radio, and the video peaked at number one on VH1.

The track "Congratulations" features guest vocals by Imogen Heap. The track "Into the Ocean" features guest vocals from Zayra Alvarez (best known for her appearance on Rock Star: Supernova). Other guest singers appear on the song "Overweight", but are not named in the album credits.

"Drilled a Wire Through My Cheek" was also included on the Saw III soundtrack and features guest vocals by Kirk Baxley. It is the "heaviest" track on the album because of its masochistic themed lyrics.

Release and promotion 
The version of the album released in Europe contains the bonus tracks "Independently Happy" and "Chameleon Boy", from Consent to Treatment and History for Sale, respectively, but does not contain the hidden track "It's Just Me". Later versions of the album feature a re-recorded version of the song "Calling You" as the final track. Foiled was Blue October’s final album to be released on cassette, and also their last to not be released on vinyl.

A premium version of the album, Foiled for the Last Time, was released on September 25, 2007, which includes fourteen of the Live at Stubb's tracks as well as the remastered version of "Calling You" and two remixes of "X Amount of Words".

Foiled remains Blue October's best-selling and most popular album, with the two hit singles "Hate Me" and "Into the Ocean" being Blue October's most popular and recognizable songs, which have become rock radio and concert staples for the band.  Although Blue October had been touring and releasing albums for eleven years prior to the release of the album, Foiled put them on the map and resulted in a surge in popularity for the band. For the next ten years, each of the band's subsequent albums would chart in the top 20, and the band would perform sold-out tours.

In 2020, Blue October's tour was canceled due to the COVID-19 pandemic. On April 17, 2020, frontman Justin Furstenfeld performed two sold-out back-to-back online concerts on Stageit, in which he performed the Foiled album in its entirety.

Track listing 
All tracks written by Justin Furstenfeld except for tracks 1, 10, and 13, co-written by Matt Novesky, Patrick Sugg, and C.B. Hudson, respectively.

Charts

Weekly charts

Year-end charts

Certifications

Personnel 
 Justin Furstenfeld — vocals, guitar, producer
 Jeremy Furstenfeld — drums
 C.B. Hudson — guitar
 Matt Noveskey — bass
 Ryan Delahoussaye — violin, keyboards
 Sarah Donaldson — cello
 Zayra Alvarez — vocals on "Into the Ocean" (track 3)
 Imogen Heap — vocals on "Congratulations" (track 7)
 Kirk Baxley — vocals on "Drilled a Wire Through My Cheek" (track 10)
 Jose Alcantar — producer, mixing
 David Castell — producer, mixing
 Phil Kaffel — mixing
 Patrick Leonard — producer, mixing
 Michael Perfitt — mixing
 Chick Reed — producer, mixing
 Joe Spix — art direction, design
 Paul Oakenfold — mixing
 Carmen Rizzo — mixing

References 

2006 albums
Blue October albums
Universal Records albums
Albums produced by David Castell